Fogo Island (Fogo, Portuguese for "Fire") is the largest of the offshore islands of Newfoundland and Labrador, Canada. The Town of Fogo Island encompasses Fogo, Joe Batt's Arm-Barr'd Islands-Shoal Bay, Seldom-Little Seldom and Tilting, with the unincorporated areas of Fogo Island. It lies off the northeast coast of Newfoundland, northwest of Musgrave Harbour across Hamilton Sound, just east of the Change Islands.

The island had a population of 2,706 people in the 2006 census, 2,395 in the 2011 census, and 2,244 in the 2016 census.

Though migratory French fishermen visited Fogo Island from the early 16th century until 1718, the first permanent settlement of the island took place in the 18th century. Fogo Harbour and Tilting Harbour were the first settlements on the island. The English and Irish descendants of the first inhabitants retained traces of their Elizabethan English and Old Irish dialects, which can be heard on the island today. The island has many ancient folk customs brought from England and Ireland, but they are disappearing.

History

Fogo Island is one of the oldest named features on the coast of Newfoundland. The Bertius map from 1606 shows Fogo Island as one of only about a dozen important features around the coast of Newfoundland. On French maps of the 16th to 18th centuries, the island is referred to as Ile des Fougues. The island was likely named by Portuguese explorers and early fishing crews in the 16th century (Fogo means Fire in Portuguese).

Until 1783, Fogo Island was on an area of the coast called the French Shore. Though English and Irish were not supposed to settle here, under the terms of the Treaty of Utrecht, they did settle; by 1750, Fogo was a thriving part of the British mercantile system of fisheries, based out of West Country English towns such as Poole, in Dorset.

Tilting Harbour on Fogo Island is a National Cultural Landscape District of Canada and is Newfoundland and Labrador's first Provincial Heritage District. Tilting is unique for its Irish culture and, some people say, its Irish dialect. The Irish Cemetery in Tilting may be the oldest in North America.

Local oral history indicates that Tilting was originally a French harbour before becoming a venue of Irish settlement. This is highly likely, given the traditional commercial and cultural links between southern Irish and northern French fishing ports. The first Irish settled in Tilting in the 1750s, and uniquely for Newfoundland, Tilting evolved into an exclusively Irish and Catholic town by the 1780s.

Beothuk traversed Fogo Island for many hundreds of years before Irish and English settlers arrived. The Beothuk pursued the seal and salmon fisheries in the area. They also travelled out to the Funk Islands to collect feathers and eggs from the birds there. In the early years of European settlement at Fogo, there were incidents of violence between the Beothuk and the Europeans. This contact ended around the year 1800. The Beothuk became extinct as a people in the late 1820s.

Fogo Island first attracted Europeans because of the extensive opportunities for commodity harvesting, including seal skins and oil, lumber, fur-bearing animals, salmon and of course cod. Over time, settlers on the island concentrated on processing dried cod, mainly because that was the product that most interested the merchants who dealt in the region of Fogo. From about 1850 until the widespread depletion of fish stocks in the 1990s, cod was king. In recent years, the economy of the island has seen diversification away from solely fishing to tourism and cultural industries.

Fishing has always been a hard life. Before Confederation with Canada, the mercantile classes of St John's, Newfoundland became rich by holding a near-monopoly stranglehold on both the supply of goods to the Newfoundland outports and on the sale of fish from them.

In the early 20th century, the Fisherman's Protective Union was formed in an attempt to break this stranglehold. It was a form of co-operative with general stores owned by fishermen for fishermen. One of the Fishermen's Union stores still stands at Seldom-Come-By on Fogo Island, now open as a museum complete with general store, port installations, fishing implements and equipment for the manufacture of cod-liver oil.

Today, the Fogo Island Cooperative continues to successfully stake footholds in new fish markets. Communities began recognising the appeal of their land and heritage as cultural tourism opportunities.

Crab and lobster fisheries have largely replaced the cod fishery; a fish-packing plant remains in operation in the town of Fogo.

A Marconi radio transmitting station was once operational atop a hill near the town of Fogo; operating with a spark-gap transmitter to establish maritime communications, the station was forced to close around the time that radio became common for household use as the spark-gap design generated unacceptable levels of radio interference. Efforts to rebuild this station as a historic site commenced in 2002.

In 1967, the island played a key role in the development of what came to be known as the "Fogo Process," a model for community media as a tool for addressing community concerns, when an Extension field worker from Memorial University, Fred Earle, and Colin Low shot 27 films with Fogo Islanders as part of the National Film Board of Canada's Challenge for Change program.

Residents defeated the Smallwood government's plans to resettle elsewhere  Fogo Islanders in the 1950s but by 1967 a downturn in the inshore fishery had forced many to turn to welfare support. The northern cod fishery closed in 1992. While the island did recover from the downturn (in part owing to the Fogo Process), the depleted state of the fishery adversely affected islanders for years to come.

Communities
In the 2006 Census there were eleven communities on Fogo Island:
The Town of Fogo Island :
Fogo 748
Joe Batt's Arm (together with Barr'd Islands and Shoal Bay) 778
Seldom (Seldom-Come-By) (together with Little Seldom) 444
Little Seldom
Tilting 248
Stag Harbour 223 (2001 population)
Island Harbour 185 (2001 population)
Deep Bay 141 (2001 population)
Fogo Island Central 15 (2001 population)
Shoal Bay
Barr'd Islands

On March 1, 2011, the towns of Fogo, Joe Batt's Arm-Barr'd Islands-Shoal Bay, Seldom-Little Seldom and Tilting and the Fogo Island Region (Stag Harbour, Island Harbour, Deep Bay, and Fogo Island Central) amalgamated to form the Town of Fogo Island.

From 1792 there was always a physician on the island. The last physician was due to leave the island in June 2022; medical care then only being available via a six-hour round trip by ferry, weather permitting. This follows economic problems and population decrease in Newfoundland and Labrador following the 1990s collapse in the cod fishery.

Climate
Fogo Island has a marine-based subarctic climate (Dfc) bordering on a cold humid continental climate (Dfb) with cooler summers than inland areas of Newfoundland as well as milder winters than areas on the same parallels in interior Canada. However, due to the very cool characteristics of summer months, Fogo Island in many ways resembles the subarctic range. The fourth warmest month of June just straddles  in mean temperature. Due to the extreme seasonal lag autumn is much warmer than spring, and as such the coldest and warmest months are February and August, respectively.

Name

Fogo Island was once called Y del Fogo, meaning Isle of Fire. There are a number of theories for the name:

Many accidental or natural forest fires destroyed the dense forests of the northern part of the island.
European mariners often saw the burning fires of the Beothuk natives, when they were visiting from across the Atlantic.
The island may have been named Fogo after the Cape Verde Island's active volcano. Note that many Newfoundland geographical features were named by the Spanish, the Portuguese and the French before anglophones (the English, the Irish and the Scots) arrived. Cape Bonavista, Cape Spear, Cape Race, Trinity Bay, Placentia Bay, Notre Dame Bay, Cape St Francis, Baccalieu Island, Baie Verte, Taslow, Baie l'Argente and even St John's or Catalina are place names that were originally named by non-English-speakers.

Transportation
Fogo Island is connected to mainland Newfoundland by the ferry MV Veteran, and served by the Fogo Aerodrome airport. The primary roads on the island are Route 333 (Fogo Island Road) and Route 334 (Joe Batt’s Arm Road), as well as Deep Bay Road and Island Harbour Road.

Notable people 
Zita Cobb – founder of Shorefast

Tourism and attractions

The island attracts a wide range of visitors interested in its history, local wildlife and other attractions. It has seven hiking trails, such as Lion's Den, Brimstone Head, Turpin's and Joe Batt's Point Trail. It also has ten Town-owned local museums and heritage properties, including the Marine Interpretation Centre, the Lane House Museum, and the Bleak House Museum. There are also museums run by local individuals, including Mona's Quilts & Jams and the Museum of the Flat Earth.

Fogo Island Arts (launched in 2008) provides a platform for contemporary art on the island, via a series of residencies hosted at different studios around Fogo.

Brimstone Head Folk Festival
The community of Fogo in Fogo Island is home to the Brimstone Head Folk Festival, hosted by the Fogo Island Folk Alliance. This event attracts people from all over every year in early August. Performers consist of many bands which have included The Masterless Men, The Irish Descendants, Middle Tickle, The Fogo Island Accordion Group, Shores of Newfoundland, The Affections and many other local performers such as Aaron Brown, Sally Payne and Jason Hoven.

Brimstone Head was touted as one of the four corners of the world by the tongue-in-cheek Flat Earth Society of Canada (not related to the Flat Earth Society).

Along with the Brimstone Head Folk Festival, other communities have festivals as well. Joe Batt's Arm hosts the Ethridge's Point Seaside Fest, which usually takes place during the first weekend in August, the weekend before the Brimstone Head festival.

Literature

Fogo Island appears in fictional form in the novel Blaze Island by Catherine Bush.

See also
Shorefast a charity devoted to economic development of the island

References

Community Profile: Fogo Town, Newfoundland and Labrador; Statistics Canada
Community Profile: Joe Batt's Arm-Barr'd Islands-Shoal Bay Town, Newfoundland and Labrador; Statistics Canada
Community Profile: Seldom-Little Seldom Town, Newfoundland and Labrador; Statistics Canada
Community Profile: Tilting Town, Newfoundland and Labrador; Statistics Canada
Community Profile: Fogo Island Region, Newfoundland and Labrador; Statistics Canada
Fogo Island Region designated places; Statistics Canada

External links

 Fogo Island - Change Islands - Farewell - Ferry Schedule
 Archaeological Survey, 1997
 Fogo Island Central Academy
 Town of Joe Batt's Arm
 Folklore and Oral History collection for Little Fogo Island

Islands of Newfoundland and Labrador
Fogo Island, Newfoundland and Labrador